Thomas P. Powell (16 April 1892 – 20 June 1971) was an Irish politician. A national schoolteacher, he was first elected to Dáil Éireann as a Fianna Fáil Teachta Dála (TD) for the Galway constituency at the June 1927 general election. He was re-elected at the September 1927 and 1932 general elections. He lost his seat at the 1933 general election. He stood unsuccessfully as an independent candidate at the 1961 general election for the Galway West constituency.

References

1892 births
1971 deaths
Fianna Fáil TDs
Members of the 5th Dáil
Members of the 6th Dáil
Members of the 7th Dáil
Irish schoolteachers
Politicians from County Galway